Labor is a small village in the City Municipality of Koper in the Littoral region of Slovenia on the border with Croatia.

The local church is dedicated to Saint Martin and belongs to the Parish of Truške.

References

External links

Labor on Geopedia

Populated places in the City Municipality of Koper